Breeds is a hamlet in the Great Waltham civil parish of the Chelmsford district of Essex, England. It is situated on South Street of the village of Great Waltham, to which it is conjoined, and of which it is part.

Hamlets in Essex
Great Waltham